The Minami-Hiyoshi Seamount is an active seamount in the Bonin Islands of Japan.

Geography
The submarine volcano complex involves four submarine volcanic peaks; Kita-Hiyoshi, Naka-Hiyoshi, Minami-Hiyoshi and the Ko-Hiyoshi submarine volcanoes. This complex is geologically connected to the Izu-Mariana arc.

Composition
Unlike volcanoes of the south and central parts of the Mariana volcanic arc, which usually are made of low-alkali and mid-alkali tholeeite basalt, the Hiyoshi complex includes more alkaline lava with more K, Ba and Sr.

Recent activity
In a report about the seismic activity of the volcano compiled in 2003, the active cone, Minami-Hiyoshi was reported to have "low activity" over the period of a month in 2001. Other than that, Minami-Hiyoshi has had many periods of activity including 1975, 1976, 1977, 1978, 1992 and 1996.

Gallery

See also
Kaitoku Seamount
List of volcanoes in Japan

References

Volcanoes of Japan
Seamounts of the Pacific Ocean
Submarine volcanoes